Mark D. Brenner (born May 26, 1969) is a Portland-based author, journalist and consultant who writes on labor and workplace issues. Brenner was formerly the co-director of Labor Notes and was previously a professor at the University of Massachusetts Amherst. He currently works at the Labor Research and Education Center at the University of Oregon.

Background 
Brenner has a master's degree in international development from the American University in Washington, D.C. and a Ph.D in economics from the University of California, Riverside. He first became interested in the living wage issue when he was a graduate student in California and was part of a research team evaluating the Los Angeles living wage ordinance.

He specializes in development and labor economics, particularly with regard to poverty, income distribution and low-wage labor markets. He was a Fulbright scholar in 1998, working in Abidjan, Côte d'Ivoire. Brenner has consulted for the United Nations Development Program and the International Labour Organization.

Brenner was a professor of economics at the University of Massachusetts Amherst and the Political Economy Research Institute. He left in September 2005 to join the staff of Labor Notes. Brenner spent several years working with living wage campaigns around the country, as well as playing a leading role in his union in Massachusetts. He currently covers SEIU, teachers, higher education, and the living wage movement.

Selected books and publications 
 Mark D. Brenner and Terry McKinley. Rising wealth inequality and changing social structure in rural China, 1988-95. UNU World Institute for Development Economics Research (1999)
 Mark D. Brenner; Jeannette Wicks-Linn; Robert Pollin. Measuring the Impact of Living Wage Laws: A Critical Appraisal of David Neumark's How Living Wage Laws Affect Low-Wage Workers and Low-Income Families. Working Paper Series No. 43, Political Economy Research Institute (2002)
 Keith Griffin (Editor); Mark D. Brenner; Keith Griffin; Takayoshi Kusago; Amy Ickowitz; Terry McKinley. Poverty Reduction in Mongolia. Asia Pacific Press (2003)
 Mark D. Brenner. The Economic Impact of Living Wage Ordinances. Working Paper 80, Political Economy Research Institute (2004)
 Mark D. Brenner, Stephanie Luce. Living Wage Laws in Practice: The Boston, New Haven and Hartford experiences (2005)
 Robert Pollin; Mark Brenner; Jeannette Wicks-Lim; Stephanie Luce. A Measure of Fairness: The Economics of Living Wages and Minimum Wages in the United States ILR Press (2008)

References 

Living people
Journalists from New York City
American trade unionists
Economists from New York (state)
University of Massachusetts Amherst faculty
1969 births
21st-century American economists